CCBN can refer to 
 British Naturism (formerly the Central Council for British Naturism)
 Corporate Communications Broadcast Network, sold to Thomson Reuters in 2004